{{Speciesbox
| status = LC
| status_system = IUCN3.1
| status_ref = 
| parent_authority = V. G. Springer & J. T. Williams, 1994
| taxon = Paralticus amboinensis
| display_parents = 3
| authority = (Bleeker, 1857)
| synonyms = *Salarias amboinensis' Bleeker, 1857 Praealticus amboinensis (Bleeker, 1857) Salarias goesii Bleeker, 1859
}}Paralticus amboinensis'', the Ambon rockskipper or the big-nose blenny, is a species of combtooth blenny found in the western  central Pacific Ocean.  This species reaches a length of  TL.  It is currently the only known member of its genus.

References

Salarinae
Taxa named by Pieter Bleeker
Fish described in 1857